Danil Dmitriyevich Khromov (born 25 December 2002) is a Russian football player. He plays for FC Arsenal Tula on loan from FC Rostov.

Club career
He made his debut in the Russian Premier League for FC Rostov on 19 June 2020 in a game against PFC Sochi. FC Rostov was forced to field their Under-18 squad in that game as their main squad was quarantined after 6 players tested positive for COVID-19.

On 29 June 2022, Khromov extended his contract with Rostov for three more years and was loaned to FC Arsenal Tula.

Career statistics

References

External links
 
 
 

2002 births
Living people
Russian footballers
Association football forwards
FC Rostov players
FC Arsenal Tula players
Russian Premier League players
Russian First League players
Russian Second League players